Cox Glacier is a small glacier immediately east of Rochray Glacier on Thurston Island, flowing south to Abbot Ice Shelf in Peacock Sound. It was delineated from air photos taken by U.S. Navy Squadron VX-6 in January 1960, and named by the Advisory Committee on Antarctic Names for Lieutenant Jerry G. Cox, a helicopter pilot aboard , who made exploratory flights to Thurston Island in February 1960. Jordan Nunatak stands between Cox and Rochray Glacier.

See also
 List of glaciers in the Antarctic
 Glaciology

Maps
 Thurston Island – Jones Mountains. 1:500000 Antarctica Sketch Map. US Geological Survey, 1967.
 Antarctic Digital Database (ADD). Scale 1:250000 topographic map of Antarctica. Scientific Committee on Antarctic Research (SCAR), 1993–2016.

References
 

Glaciers of Thurston Island